Anti-immunoglobulin antibodies are defined as a protein that detects other antibodies from an organism. Specifically, anti-immunoglobulin antibodies are created by B-cells as antibodies to bind to other immunoglobulins. Immunoglobulins have two regions: the constant region and the variable region. The constant region is involved in effector function, while the variable region is involved in recognizing and binding to antigens. Anti-immunoglobulin antibodies may bind to either the variable or constant region of the immunoglobulin. Anti-immunoglobulin antibodies are a type of secondary antibody. They are able to detect primary antibodies through multiple methods such as a Western blot, immunohistochemistry, immunofluorescence staining, flow cytometry, and ELISA.

Creation of Anti-immunoglobulin Antibodies 
The anti-immunoglobulin antibodies are created through recombinant DNA technology. Production via recombinant DNA technology allows the highest level of batch-to-batch reproducibility. This method of antibody engineering can expand the antibody compatibility to multiple assay components. All anti-immunoglobulin antibodies are laboratory-made, so they are a type of clonal antibody. Clonal antibodies are engineered in a laboratory to mimic the effects of primary antibodies. Clonal antibodies can either be monoclonal or polyclonal. Monoclonal antibodies are clones of one antibody; therefore, monoclonal antibodies can only bind to one target. Polyclonal antibodies are clones of multiple antibodies and immune cells, so they can bind to various targets. Recombinant clonal antibodies are produced through in-vitro cloning. The in-vitro cloning process occurs through inserting genes for an antibody’s light and heavy region into an expression vector. The vector is then introduced into host cells for expression. Hosts can range from rabbits to mice to goats. Anti-immunoglobulin antibodies are recognizable by their clone name. The clone name is commonly placed in brackets after the written name.

Anti-Human Immunoglobulin Antibodies 

Anti-antibodies for human purposes are able to recognize IgM, IgA, IgE, IgD, and IgG. To detect all isotypes of human antibodies, anti-human kappa and lambda light chain antibodies are available. Anti-human immunoglobulin antibodies are available for purchase on a commercial laboratory scale.

Anti-IgG 
There are anti-IgG antibodies that are heavy-and-light chain specific, Fc-part specific, and hinge-part specific.

Anti-IgM 
IgM antibodies are the largest antibodies and are the first to respond in an immune response. Anti-IgM antibodies are used to detect the presence of IgM antibodies in human serums. IgM antibodies are responsible for blood clotting during incorrect donor blood transfusions.

Anti-IgE 
IgE antibodies are the least abundant immunoglobulins in the immune response. They are commonly found in response to allergic reactions. Using anti-antibodies for IgE can help prevent histamine responses.

Anti-IgA 
The antibody IgA is most commonly found in mucosal secretions such as tears and saliva, but it is rarely found circulating in the bloodstream. Around 15% of antibodies produced each day are the IgA isotype.

Anti-IgD 
Immature B-lymphocytes most commonly express the IgD isotype. IgD can also be found circulating in blood serum. IgD signals B cells to activate the immune response. This role is also shared by IgM. IgD is functional in the respiratory immune defense system since they activate basophils and mast cells that secrete antimicrobial factors.

Anti-Lambda Light Chain 
Lambda light chains are one of the two classes of light chains present on mammalian immunoglobulins. They are found in combination with kappa light chains. These chains are usually present in a 70:30 ratio of kappa to lambda. Anti-lambda light chain antibodies can nonspecifically bind to multiple isotypes of immunoglobulins.

Anti-Kappa Light Chain 
Kappa light chains are the second of the two classes of light chains present on mammalian immunoglobulins. One immunoglobulin only has one type of light chain. Each light chain has both a constant and a variable region.

It is critical to note that these are not the only anti-human immunoglobulin antibodies. These are examples of the most common anti-immunoglobulin antibodies used in current human research. These antibodies can be purchased on a commercial scale.

Anti-Non-Human Immunoglobulin Antibodies 
A majority of non-human immunoglobulin antibodies are detected in non-human primate (NHP) models. The NHP models serve as proxies for humans during preclinical studies. The most common NHP models for important antibody isotypes and subtypes include rhesus macaques, cynomolgus monkeys, and baboons. Therefore, certain antibodies will only react with certain NHP species. The most common antibody isotypes are rhesus monkey macaque and cynomolgus monkey IgG1 and IgG4.

Anti-Macaque

Anti-Baboon 
While the methods used in Anti-baboon antibody creation and detection are very similar, each anti-antibody is responsible for identifying a different isotype of IgG. The isotypes include IgG1, IgG2, IgG3, and IgG4.

Anti-Rhesus 
The following anti-rhesus antibodies are isotypes of anti-IgG. The isotypes include IgG1 and IgG4. Both [2C6] and [7A8] are subtypes of anti-IgG4.

Anti-Pan-Primate

Anti-Marmoset 

It is critical to note that these are not the only anti-non-human immunoglobulin antibodies. These are examples of the most common anti-immunoglobulin antibodies used in current NHP research.

Clinical Applications 
Recombinant monoclonal anti-immunoglobulin antibodies have various clinical applications that include diagnosis, disease treatment, and research. The most practical use for anti-immunoglobulin antibodies is in diagnostic tests. Assays use anti-immunoglobulin antibodies to detect immune responses in cancer patients, autoimmune therapy drug developments, infectious disease studies, and vaccine trials. The most current application of anti-immunoglobulin antibodies is in the development of asthma treatments and COVID-19 detection.

Anti-immunoglobulin IgE antibodies are currently being used in asthma treatment medications for severe cases. The treatment focuses on bronchial asthma which is defined as the chronic inflammation of airways. Symptoms include wheezing, dyspnea, and cough. The use of anti-immunoglobulin E antibodies is reserved for severe cases of asthma that are related to allergic reactions. Long term treatment plans for severe asthma come in four steps, with use of an anti-IgE antibody being used in the fourth step in conjunction with an inhaled corticosteroid. The use of anti-IgE antibodies in treatment is only effective in patients with a serum total IgE value within 30-1500 IU/mL. Omalizumab is the drug therapy used to deliver the anti-immunoglobulin E antibodies. Omalizumab is a human anti-IgE monoclonal antibody. It blocks IgE-mediated reactions and reduces asthma symptoms by binding to free IgE antibodies in serum. The drug is delivered every 2-4 weeks depending on severity of the patient. Effectiveness of the drug is predictive of higher eosinophil counts, higher serum periostin counts, and higher fractional exhaled nitric oxide levels. The treatment is effective in about 60% of patients.

With the spread of COVID-19 worldwide, it became vital for researchers to develop an efficient method to detect COVID-19 in PCR tests. In 2021 researchers developed an assay to detect both viral RNA and human antibodies from one clinical sample. The assay is known as OPIPE, a one-pot pre-coated interface proximity extension assay. The assay recognizes antibodies by using a pre-coated antigen interface and a pair of anti-antibodies labeled with oligosaccharides. The recognized antibodies extend to double stranded DNA templates to initiate the final steps of the PCR. The serum detection level is 100 fg/mL for the anti-SARS-CoV-2 antibody and 10 copies/µL for viral DNA. The success of the method to co-detect viral RNA and human antibodies is imperative in finding cheaper alternatives for COVID-19 infection identifications.

References 

Antibodies